The Men's 100 metre breaststroke competition of the 2016 FINA World Swimming Championships (25 m) was held on 6 and 7 December 2016.

Records
Prior to the competition, the existing world and championship records were as follows.

Results

Heats
The heats were held at 12:10.

Semifinals
The semifinals were held at 19:34.

Semifinal 1

Semifinal 2

Final
The final was held at 18:58.

References

Men's 100 metre breaststroke